The M83 kevlar helmet is a combat helmet of South African manufactured by South African Pith Helmet Industries (S.A.P.H.I) of Rosslyn, adopted in 1983 from the Israeli headset OR-201. The kevlar composite M83 saw extensive use by the Paratroopers and Recce Commandos during the South African Border War, which took place from 1966 to 1989 in South-West Africa (Namibia) and Angola. It is still used by the South African National Defence Force.

References

Combat helmets of South Africa